In the North American Numbering Plan, telephone area code 337 covers southwestern Louisiana.  It was created in 1999. Until 1999/2000, this area was the southern half of area code 318, which had covered most of Louisiana west of the Mississippi River since 1957.

Prior to October 2021, area code 337 had telephone numbers assigned for the central office code 988. In 2020, 988 was designated nationwide as a dialing code for the National Suicide Prevention Lifeline, which created a conflict for exchanges that permit seven-digit dialing. This area code was therefore scheduled to transition to ten-digit dialing by October 24, 2021.

Cities in the 337 area code 

 Abbeville, Louisiana
 Arnaudville, Louisiana
 Baldwin, Louisiana
 Basile, Louisiana
 Breaux Bridge, Louisiana
 Broussard, Louisiana
 Cade, Louisiana
 Cameron, Louisiana
 Carencro, Louisiana
 Carlyss, Louisiana
 Cecilia, Louisiana
 Centerville, Louisiana
 Charenton, Louisiana
 Church Point, Louisiana
 Crowley, Louisiana
 Delcambre, Louisiana
 DeRidder, Louisiana
 Duson, Louisiana
 Elton, Louisiana
 Erath, Louisiana
 Eunice, Louisiana
 Franklin, Louisiana
 Grand Coteau, Louisiana
 Gueydan, Louisiana
 Henderson, Louisiana
 Iota, Louisiana
 Iowa, Louisiana
 Jeanerette, Louisiana
 Jennings, Louisiana
 Kaplan, Louisiana
 Kinder, Louisiana
 Krotz Springs, Louisiana
 Lafayette, Louisiana
 Lake Arthur, Louisiana
 Lake Charles, Louisiana
 Leesville, Louisiana
 Leonville, Louisiana
 Loreauville, Louisiana
 Mamou, Louisiana
 Maurice, Louisiana
 Melville, Louisiana
 Mermentau, Louisiana
 Merryville, Louisiana
 Moss Bluff, Louisiana
 New Iberia, Louisiana
 Oberlin, Louisiana
 Opelousas, Louisiana
 Palmetto, Louisiana
 Parks, Louisiana
 Port Barre, Louisiana
 Rayne, Louisiana
 Scott, Louisiana
 St. Martinville, Louisiana
 Sulphur, Louisiana
 Sunset, Louisiana
 Ville Platte, Louisiana
 Vinton, Louisiana
 Washington, Louisiana
 Welsh, Louisiana
 Westlake, Louisiana
 Youngsville, Louisiana

See also 
 List of Louisiana area codes

References

Telecommunications-related introductions in 1999
337
337